Girl in Room 13 (also known as A Moça do Quarto 13 in Brazil, and as Agente secreto 013 in Mexico) is a 1960 American film starring Brian Donlevy and directed by Richard E. Cunha.

Plot
American detective Steve Marshall goes to Sao Paulo, Brazil, in search of fugitive murderess Louise Dunning. Marshall contacts Louise and she explains that she murdered her husband in self-defense. Meanwhile, Marshall stumbles upon a counterfeiting ring and becomes a suspect. He unwittingly helps the police set a trap to catch the gang and, after a double-cross, the criminals are captured. Louise decides to remain in Brazil.

Cast
Brian Donlevy as Steve Marshall
Andrea Bayard as Louise Dunning / Kitty Herman
Victor Merinow as Victor Marlow
Elizabeth Howard as Elizabeth
John Herbert as Police Captain

Reception
A review in TV Guide describes the film as a "Brazilian quickie," with "an aging Donlevy wasted as a private eye from the States who is tracking a murderer. [...] Not an elegant way for Donlevy to wind down his career." A synopsis of the film at AllMovie describes the Donlevy character as a "gringo gumshoe."

References

External links
Girl in Room 13 at TCMDB
Girl in Room 13 at IMDb
Girl in Room 13 at BFI

1960 films
1960 crime drama films
1960s English-language films
American crime drama films
American detective films
Astor Pictures films
Films directed by Richard E. Cunha
Films set in Brazil
Films set in São Paulo
1960s American films